Charles "C.C." Chapman is an American author, marketing consultant, and frequent speaker about content marketing.

He is a former manager of PodShow's Podsafe Music Network, and was a prominent figure in the community of podcasting and podsafe music. After serving as the VP of New Marketing for crayon, Chapman co-founded his own company, The Advance Guard, a marketing company which focused on utilizing social media and other emerging technologies. It was acquired by Campfire in August 2009. Since then, Chapman has been an independent consultant, frequent event speaker, and authored two books: Content Rules, written with Ann Handley, and Amazing Things Will Happen.

Currently he is a visiting instructor of Business and Management at Wheaton College and the Program & Partnership Director for Wheaton Innovates with MassChallenge.

He's a member of the Aspen Institutes National Commission on Social, Emotional, and Academic Development: Parent Advisory Panel, on the board of The Hockey Foundation, part of the No Kid Hungry Social Council.

Background
In 1996, just before graduating from Bentley University, Chapman co-founded an independent film production company, Random Foo Pictures, with good friend Dan Gorgone. Chapman acted in, produced and directed a number of short films, including Inquisition. However, it was his experience marketing the group's projects that led to his first experiences with online promotion, networking, and sharing media online.

Chapman has always tried to stay ahead of the curve by utilizing the newest web technologies. He started his first blog in July 2001, his first podcast in December 2004, and opened a music cafe in the virtual world of Second Life in November 2006.

Podcasting
From his home studio in the Boston area, Chapman began hosting the independent music-focused podcast Accident Hash in 2005 and the new media podcast Managing the Gray in 2006. During the summer of 2005, Hash was one of the first podcasts to be included in the iTunes Podcast directory and it became a featured podcast on PodShow. Accident Hash was later voted Best Podsafe Music Podcast at the 2006 Podcast Awards.

Chapman also became a popular guest and occasional guest host on many other podcasts across the world discussing topics ranging from podsafe music to new marketing. Included in his many appearances are stints guest hosting Adam Curry's Podshow on the Sirius Stars channel and as a panelist on The BeanCast Marketing Podcast.

Awards

Publications
 Content Rules: How to Create Killer Blogs, Podcasts, Videos, Ebooks, Webinars (and More) That Engage Customers and Ignite Your Business by Ann Handley and C.C. Chapman
 Amazing Things Will Happen: A Real-World Guide on Achieving Success and Happiness by C.C. Chapman

Personal life
C.C. Chapman was born and raised in New Hampshire and currently lives in Massachusetts. He is married with two children and a graduate of Bentley University.

Notes

External links
 C.C. Chapman's official blog
 
 C.C. Chapman on The BeanCast Marketing Podcast
 C.C. Chapman discusses his co-authored book Content Rules on the Copyright Clearance Center podcast

Year of birth missing (living people)
Living people
American male bloggers
American bloggers
Bentley University alumni
Writers from Boston
Writers from New Hampshire
American podcasters
Wheaton College (Massachusetts) faculty